Gree may refer to:

GREE, a social networking service in Japan
GREE, Inc., the company that operates GREE
Gree Electric, Chinese appliance manufacturer
Gree Group, Chinese state-owned enterprise, former owner of GREE Electric
Alain Grée (born 1936), French illustrator and author
MC Gree (born 1998), South Korean rapper